Grama Bharathi High School is a repetitious school of Krishnarajpet talluk, Karnataka, India. Here more than 800 students are studying.

Schools in Mandya district
High schools and secondary schools in Karnataka
Educational institutions in India with year of establishment missing